"Sandunguera" is a bolero written by Marcelino Guerra and Luis Piedra for Arsenio Rodríguez in 1943. Arsenio's version, however, was arranged as an uptempo guaracha and released as the B-side of Pablo Cairo's "Sin tu querer" by RCA Victor. The song has since been covered by multiple artists, including Marcelino Guerra himself, and has been called a "classic track" and an important recording in the development of Arsenio's career.

Background and recording
At the time of the recording, Arsenio's conjunto was beginning to make recordings, with a rather variable lineup. With the incorporation of Lilí Martínez (1945) and later Félix Chappottín (1950), the conjunto reached its peak of success and maturity. However, records such as "Sandunguera" have been highlighted as early examples of Arsenio's trademark syle of interlocking rhythms and sudden tempo changes. Describing the original recording, Ned Sublette emphasized how the pianist, Adolfo "Panacea" O'Reilly, "drops into bell-like quarter-note octaves on the piano to lock in with the cowbell". He goes on to define the song as a thrilling "new sound", which paved the way for classic recordings such as "Deuda" and "El reloj de Pastora".

The lyrics of the song extol the beauty of a mulata, a black woman, often called sandunguera in Cuba, the adjetival form of sandunga (grace, charm). Thus, although not his own composition, the song is considered an example of Arsenio's African-inspired repertory which alludes to his own heritage.

Cover versions
"Sandunguera" has been covered multiple times, often as a bolero, and sometimes as a guaracha reminiscent of Arsenio's original. It was recorded by the Puerto Rican ensemble Sexteto Borinquen in their 1963 album Sexteto Borinquen Vol. 2, released by Ansonia, and by La Playa Sextet in their 1965 album La Playa in Puerto Rico, released by United Artists. Another Puerto Rican band, Orquesta Corporación Latina, recorded a salsa arrangement with a guaguancó rhythm in 1983. It has also been recorded by salsa singer Oscar D'León (1978), son cubano vocalist Miguel Quintana (1986) and Marcelino Guerra himself (1996), who did so in Spain for the record label Nubenegra. Another recording was made by Los Naranjos in 1998 under the title "Sandunguera mujer".

Personnel
Arsenio Rodríguez – leader, tres
Pedro Luis Sarracent – lead vocals, claves
Miguelito Cuní – lead vocals, maracas
Rubén Calzado – first trumpet, arranger
Benetín Bustillo – second trumpet
Adolfo "Panacea" O'Reilly – piano
Nilo Alfonso – double bass
Enrique "Kike" Rodríguez – tumbadora
Antolín "Papa Kila" Suárez – bongó

See also
Arsenio Rodríguez discography

References

1943 songs
Boleros
Guaracha